Jeff Kirschenbaum is an American film producer and member of the Producers Guild of America. He is known for collaborating with Joe Roth.

Filmography
He was a producer in all films unless otherwise noted.

Film

Miscellaneous crew

Television

References

External links
 

American film producers
Year of birth missing (living people)
Living people